Premier Airways (promoted as Easy Air) is a low fare airline project based in Chennai, Tamil Nadu, India. It had proposed to launch low cost regional scheduled services, for which it received a No Objection Certificate (NOC) from the Ministry of Civil Aviation in June 2014. The NOC has since expired before the airline could start operations.

The Public Limited company was founded in August 2005 by a group of Non Resident Indian (NRI) entrepreneurs.

Premier Airways Ltd, which owns the Easy Air brand, is promoted by US-based Umapathy Pinghapani, and was to be a low-cost carrier modelled on the lines of Southwest Airlines. The promoters planned to fund USD 20 million of the USD 60 million project. The airline planned to purchase 40 Airbus A320 NEO aircraft worth $4.3 billion and aims to start in the last quarter of 2015 or the first quarter of 2016 with leased aircraft.

References 

Proposed airlines of India